The Clarksdale Municipal School District (CMSD) is a public school district based in Clarksdale, Mississippi, United States.

History
Around the time of racial integration, circa the 1960s, the district arranged attendance boundaries of elementary schools so de facto segregation would occur. There had been plans to build a new consolidated Clarksdale-Coahoma County High School to serve all children in Coahoma County, plans were abandoned, even though the building was already constructed, because the officials wanted to maintain segregation in a de facto manner.

Performance
In 2019, "the district remains classified as low performing, bouncing between D and F every year since 2013. ...In the 2017-2018 school year, 19% of the district's teachers were not certified and – perhaps consequently – the district received an F rating." The district "has trouble retaining highly qualified educators."

Schools
 High School
 Clarksdale High School
J. W. Stampley 9th Grade Academy

 Middle schools
Oakhurst Intermediate School
W. A. Higgins Middle School (formerly Junior High School)

Elementary schools
Each elementary school has a school theme.
Heidelberg Elementary School – Math and science.
Kirkpatrick Elementary School – Health sciences.
George H. Oliver Elementary School – Visual and performing arts.
Booker T. Washington Elementary School – International Baccalaureate –Brenda Miller– Principal

Former schools
Former elementary schools:
 Myrtle Hall III Elementary School
 Myrtle Hall IV Elementary School
 Riverton Elementary School
 Jerome Y. Stamply Elementary School

Demographics

Circa 2017 the district had about 3,200 students. Circa 2008 the district had about 3,600 students.

2006-07 school year
There were a total of 3,603 students enrolled in the Clarksdale Municipal School District during the 2006–2007 school year. The gender makeup of the district was 50% female and 50% male. The racial makeup of the district was 94.34% African American, 4.75% White, 0.75% Asian, and 0.17% Hispanic. 89.9% of the district's students were eligible to receive free lunch.

Previous school years

Accountability statistics

See also
List of school districts in Mississippi

References

External links
 

Education in Coahoma County, Mississippi
School districts in Mississippi
Clarksdale, Mississippi